Frederick Arthur Goding (26 February 1905 – 12 January 1981) was an Australian rules footballer who played with Richmond in the Victorian Football League (VFL).

Originally from Oakleigh, Goding played in the Melbourne seconds, before arriving at Richmond. He appeared at the 1928 VFL Grand Final in the forward pocket.

References

External links

1905 births
1981 deaths
Australian rules footballers from Melbourne
Richmond Football Club players
Oakleigh Football Club players
People from Oakleigh, Victoria